FK Bokelj is a Montenegrin professional football club based in the coastal town of Kotor. They currently compete in the Montenegrin Second League.

History
History of Bokelj started at the second decade of 20th century. The team was founded on 30 July 1922 as SK Primorac. Primorac played its first game against FK Zrinjski Tivat and won 2-1. In 1926, the team was renamed as FK Bokelj and until 1941 played numerous seasons in the Montenegrin Football Championship. In that period, FK Bokelj played four times in the final of the Montenegrin Championship, but never won it.
After the war, Bokelj started to play in the Montenegrin Republic League in 1947. Only four years later, the team from Kotor were promoted to the Yugoslav Second League (season 1951). From that year to 1991, FK Bokelj played overall nine seasons in the Yugoslav Second League. During the other seasons, the club participated in the Montenegrin Republic League (third rank of football in SFR Yugoslavia), winning the title eight times. Except that, in the period between 1988-1992, Bokelj played four seasons in the new-established Yugoslav Third League.
In 1999, Bokelj gained a new promotion to the Second League, this time in FR Yugoslavia football system. Until 2006, they spent seven consecutive seasons in the Second League, with second place in the 2002-03 season as their biggest success at that time.
Historical success, FK Bokelj made in summer 2007, with their promotion to the Montenegrin First League. First game at top-tier, FK Bokelj played on 11 August 2007, against Rudar in Pljevlja (0:0). Best result, FK Bokelj made in the 2015-16 season, finished in fourth-placed team in the First League. With that success, the team gained its first participation in European Competitions (2016–17 UEFA Europa League), with games against Serbian-side FK Vojvodina. Until now, the club from Kotor played five seasons in the highest league competition in Montenegro.

First League Record

For the first time, Bokelj played in the Montenegrin First League in the 2007–08 season. Below is a list of FK Bokelj scores in the First League by every single season.

FK Bokelj in European competitions

For the first time, FK Bokelj played in European competitions in the 2016–17 season. Until now, they played one season in European cups.

Honours and achievements
Montenegrin Second League – 2
winners (2): 2010–11, 2013–14
 runners-up (2): 2006–07, 2012–13
 Montenegrin Republic League – 8
winners (8): 1947–48, 1950, 1953–54, 1955–56, 1956–57, 1970–71, 1985–86, 1987-88
 Montenegrin Republic Cup – 2
winners (2): 1948–49, 1973–74

Players

Current squad

Notable players

Note: this list includes players that have played at least 100 league games and/or have reached international status.

 Ibrahim Walidjo
 Bruno Knežević
 Mladen Kašćelan
 Milan Mijatović
 Nikola Nikezić
 Dejan Ognjanović
 Danijel Petković
 Aleksandar Šćekić

Historical list of coaches

 Aleksandar Miljenović (2007 - Nov 2007)
 Ivo Donković (26 Nov 2007 - )
 Slobodan Drašković (Jul 2010 - Jun 2012)
 Ratko Stevović (Jul 2012 - Jun 2013)
 Slobodan Drašković (Jul 2013 - Apr 2017)
 Milorad Malovrazić (14 Apr 2017 - Jun 2017)
 Marko Vidojević (1 Jul 2017 - 1 Jan 2018)
 Aleksandar Madžar (8 Jan 2018 - Jun 2018)
 Milorad Malovrazić (10 Jul 2018 - 27 Apr 2019)
 Dragan Đorđević (30 Apr 2019 - Dec 2019)
 Slavoljub Bubanja (12 Oct 2019 - Jul 2020)
 Zoran Krivokapić (22 Oct 2020 - )

Supporters 
"Beštije" (The Beasts) is the popular name for FK Bokelj supporters group. Established in 1986, they are the oldest ultras group from Montenegro. Except FK Bokelj, they are also attending games of PVK Primorac.

Stadium

Bokelj's home ground is Stadion pod Vrmcem at the Rakite suburb in Kotor, near the Adriatic coast. Today, stadium has a capacity of about 2,000 seats on one terrace. Except Bokelj's matches, at the stadion pod Vrmcem every year is playing final match of Nikša Bućin Cup, competition for Third League clubs from south Montenegro.
In addition to the main field is an auxiliary field with artificial grass that is used for competitions in the junior categories.

Sponsors
Official sponsor: Port of Kotor
Official kit supplier: Joma

See also
 Stadion pod Vrmcem
 Kotor
 Montenegrin First League
 Montenegrin clubs in Yugoslav football competitions (1946–2006)

References

External links
Profile by Weltfussballarchiv 

 
Association football clubs established in 1922
Football clubs in Montenegro
1922 establishments in Montenegro